

The Temenos Academy Review is a journal published in London by the Temenos Academy since 1998. As per the academy, "The Review comprises a mixture of papers given at the Academy and new work, including poetry, art, and reviews." Its predecessor, Temenos, was published from 1981 to 1992 and inspired The Prince of Wales to sponsor the creation of the Temenos Academy in 1990.

History 

Temenos launched in 1980, with first publication in 1981. Temenos was cofounded by Kathleen Raine, Philip Sherrard, Keith Critchlow and Brian Keeble, and was produced for thirteen volumes, with Raine becoming the sole editor by the fourth issue.  The word "temenos" means "sacred place" or "sacred enclosure". The journal had an objective of "The affirmation, at the highest level of scholarship and talent, and in terms of the contemporary situation, of the Sacred." The Prince of Wales was sufficiently impressed by the journal to sponsor a school based "on truth, beauty and goodness", and this led to the creation of the Temenos Academy in 1990.  Henri Corbin's L'Universite de St Jean de Jerusaleme school founded in Paris in 1974, was an inspiration for the founding of Temenos Academy. But while Corbin's school held to an Abrahamic tradition, the new teaching organisation also looked to the teaching of Buddhism and Hinduism. The thirteenth and last issue of Temenos appeared in 1992.

By 1998, the journal reappeared as the Temenos Academy Review and three more volumes were edited by Kathleen Raine. Grevel Lindop was editor for the review from 2000 to 2003; and volume 7, the Kathleen Raine Memorial Issue, was edited by Brian Keeble. , there have been 18 volumes. Contributing authors include Wendell Berry, Prince Charles, Karan Singh and Seyyed Hossein Nasr.

The headquarters of Temenos Academy Review are in Ashford, Kent.

References

External links
 Official website

1998 establishments in England
Annual magazines published in the United Kingdom
Visual arts magazines published in the United Kingdom
Literary magazines published in the United Kingdom
English-language magazines
Magazines established in 1998
Mass media in Kent
Magazines about spirituality